Alexander of Greece (1893–1920) was king of Greece from 1917 until his death.

Alexander of Greece may also refer to:
 Alexander of Greece (rhetorician)
 Alexander the Great (356–323 BC), ancient Greek king and general

See also
 Alexander § People with the given name Alexander